Paranthaclisis is a genus of antlions in the family Myrmeleontidae. There are five described species in Paranthaclisis.

Species
These five species belong to the genus Paranthaclisis:
 Paranthaclisis californica Navás, 1922
 Paranthaclisis congener (Hagen, 1861)
 Paranthaclisis floridensis Stange & Miller, 2012
 Paranthaclisis hageni (Banks, 1899)
 Paranthaclisis nevadensis Banks, 1939

References

Further reading

 

Acanthaclisini
Articles created by Qbugbot
Myrmeleontidae genera